Questions!/Answers? is a series of ten educational films released in 1975 by Walt Disney Productions. The series dealt with many moral topics and it excerpted many sequences from various live-action Disney films.

Films

 Alcoholism: Who Gets Hurt? — A child is facing alcoholism of his parents. Includes excerpts from Follow Me, Boys!
 Love and Duty: Which Comes First? — On the notion of loyalty, duty and love. Includes excerpts from True Vagabond
 Responsibility: What Are Its Limits? — Personal responsibility
 Stepparents: Where Is the Love? —  On adoptive families
 Optimist/Pessimist: Which Are You?
 Death: How Can You Live with It? — a boy learns to accept the death of her grandfather. Includes excerpts from Napoleon and Samantha
Your Career: Your Decision? — A girl wants to be a ballerina against the advice of her mother. Includes excerpts from Ballerina
 Prejudice: Hatred or Ignorance — A young man tries to overcome prejudice. Includes excerpts from The Light in the Forest
 Being Right: Can You Still Lose?
 Ambition: What Price Fulfillment?

Notes

Disney educational films
Disney short film series
1975 films
1970s educational films